Music Fuh Ya' (Musica Para Tu) is an album by American blues artist Taj Mahal, which was released in 1977.

Track listing
All tracks composed and arranged by Taj Mahal; except where indicated
 "You Got It"
 "Freight Train" (Elizabeth Cotten)
 "Baby, You're My Destiny"
"Sailin' Into Walkers Cay"
 "Truck Driver's Two Step"
 "The Four Mills Brothers" (Durrie Parks)
 "Honey Babe"
 "Curry" (Ray Fitzpatrick)

Personnel
Taj Mahal - vocals, acoustic guitar, harmonica, banjo, mandolin
Ray Fitzpatrick - bass, acoustic guitar, piano
Rudy Costa - saxophone, bass, clarinet, flute, kalimba 
Larry McDonald - percussion, piano
Kwasi Dzidzornu - congas, percussion
Kester Smith - drums, percussion
Robert Greenidge - steel drums

References

1977 albums
Taj Mahal (musician) albums
Warner Records albums